A periférico is a ring road in the Spanish-speaking world.

Periférico may also refer to:

 Anillo Periférico, a beltway in Mexico City
 Anillo Periférico Ecológico, a beltway in Puebla, Mexico
 Periférico (Mexibús), a BRT station in Tlalnepantla, Mexico
 Periférico, a Mexicable station
 Periférico (Xochimilco Light Rail), a light rail station in Tlalpan, Mexico City
 Periférico Belenes railway station, in Zapopan, Jalisco
 Periférico Norte railway station, in Zapopan, Jalisco
 Periférico Oriente metro station, in Tláhuac, Mexico City
 Periférico Sur, a station in Tlaquepaque, Jalisco, on Line 1 of the Guadalajara light rail system